Gillanders is a personal name and a surname. It is an Anglicised form of a Gaelic name meaning "the servant of (St) Andrew". The surname can be represented in Scottish Gaelic as MacGill-Andreis (masculine) and NicGill-Andreis (feminine); GillAndrais (m) and GhillAndrais (f); Mac'Ill'Anndrais (m) and Nic'Ill'Anndrais (f); and MacGill-Andreis (m) and NicGill-Andreis (f).

Gillanders may refer to:

People 
Brendan Gillanders (born 1990), Canadian football player
 Bronwyn Gillanders (born 1962), New Zealander ecologist
Dave Gillanders (born 1939), American swimmer
John Gillanders (1895–1946), First World War flying ace
Ken Gillanders, Australian botanist and Order of Australia recipient.

Other uses 
Clan Gillanders, Scottish clan centred in Ross